Camp Ford was a POW camp near Tyler, Texas, during the American Civil War. It was the largest Confederate-run prison west of the Mississippi.

History 
Camp Ford is not a battlefield memorial, it is the site of a prison camp where over 350 US Army personnel died of starvation, exposure, and disease. Their names are listed on unit honor rolls for units of Ohio and Pennsylvania infantry among others. Established in the spring of 1862 as a training camp for new Confederate recruits, the camp was named for Col. John Salmon Ford, a Texas Ranger and the Superintendent of Conscripts for the State of Texas. 

 The first Union prisoners to arrive at camp Ford in August 1863 included officers captured in Brashear City Louisiana in June, and included naval personnel captured when the 'Queen Of The West' and the 'Diana' were seized by the Confederate Navy.  The captives were initially held in the open, but a panic ensued in November 1863 when 800 new prisoners threatened a mass breakout. A military stockade enclosing  was soon erected.

With over 2,000 new prisoners taken in Louisiana on April 8 and 9 1864, at the battles of Mansfield, and Pleasant Hill, the stockade was quadrupled in size. Among those imprisoned there following these battles were 17 members of the 47th Pennsylvania Infantry Regiment, the only regiment from the Commonwealth of Pennsylvania to fight in the Union's 1864 Red River Campaign across Louisiana and the only regiment from the Keystone State to have men imprisoned at Camp Ford.  With more prisoners captured in Arkansas, the prison's population peaked at about 5,000 in July 1864. The population was reduced by exchanges in July and October 1864, and again in February 1865. The last 1,761 prisoners were exchanged on May 22, 1865.

Camp layout 
 Multiple Union soldiers who held as POWs at Camp Ford documented their confinement through diaries kept during their time there. One such diary was created by James S. McClain, who had been captured on May 3, 1864, and was held until the final exchange of prisoners on May 27, 1865. Included in McClain's documentation were sketches of various buildings and other aspects of the camp.

Camp today 
The original site of the camp stockade is now a public historic park, owned by Smith County, Texas, and managed by the Smith County Historical Society, a 501(c)(3) non-profit organization founded in 1959 by individuals and business firms dedicated to discovering, collecting and preserving data, records and other items relating to the history of Smith County. The park contains a kiosk, paved trail, interpretive signage, a cabin reconstruction, and a picnic area. The camp is located on US Highway 271, .7 miles north of Loop 323 in Tyler, Texas.  The geographical coordinates are: 32°23'44.13"N - 95°16'7.28"W. The property is exempt from County property taxation.

References

External links 
 Camp Ford Civil War Prison (video). Washington, D.C.: C-SPAN, March 12, 2018.
 Camp Ford Historic Park, C.S.A., in Texas Forest Trail. Nacogdoches, Texas: Texas Forest Trail Region and Texas Historical Commission, retrieved online August 4, 2019.
 Camp Ford Historic Site and Park (profile). Washington, D.C.: American Battlefield Trust, retrieved online August 4, 2019.
 Texas Beyond History: Camp Ford. Austin, Texas: Texas Archeological Research Laboratory at the University of Texas at Austin.
 Civil War Prisons, in CensusDiggins.com.
 The American Civil War;  Prisoner of War Camps

1862 establishments in Texas
1865 disestablishments in Texas
American Civil War prison camps
Buildings and structures in Smith County, Texas
American Civil War army posts
Defunct prisons in Texas
Military installations established in 1862
Military installations closed in 1865
Military installations of the Confederate States of America
Texas in the American Civil War